Cochylimorpha scoptes is a species of moth of the family Tortricidae. It is found in Kashmir.

References

Moths described in 1984
Cochylimorpha
Taxa named by Józef Razowski
Moths of Asia